Zacharia Maidjida is a Central African Republic Olympic middle-distance runner. He represented his country in the men's 1500 meters and the men's 800 meters at the 1992 Summer Olympics. His times were a 1:50.41 and a 3:55.72.

References

1969 births
Living people
Olympic athletes of the Central African Republic
Athletes (track and field) at the 1992 Summer Olympics